Sultan Batara Shah Tengah (also known as Pangiran Tindig or Pangiran Tengah) was the 8th Sultan of Sulu. He reigned from 1596 to 1608 (Some other Sulu Tarsilas or genealogical records say he reigned from 1585 to 1600). He was the son of the previous Sultan Muhammad ul-Halim, also known as Pangiran Buddiman.

The title "Batara" in his name is a reference to Brunei annals, which used the title "Batara" to identify rulers of Sulu as there were numerous cases of intermarriage between the 2 royal houses. "Shah" may have been his actual given name or another royal title, referencing the Persian royal title. "Tengah" on the other hand, was another title, or an indication of birth order, as this meant he was in between an older brother and a younger brother.

During his reign, he was known for being an intelligent and respectable ruler of Sulu, as well as an advocate of the Sharia Law in his domains. His reign also marked the end of the first phase of the Spanish–Moro conflict, a conflict to span 3 centuries, throughout the Spanish colonisation of the Philippines. Moro raids began to frequent during his reign, with slave-raiding parties from many of his subjects across Sulu beginning to terrorise and ravage the coasts of the Philippines and its environs.

Early life 
During his father's reign, Sulu gained de facto independence and trading rights from the Bruneian Empire. In 1578, the same year Sulu gained freedom, the Spaniards sent a military expedition that ended in Pangiran Buddiman's agreement on a regular tribute of pearls to be sent from Sulu to Spanish Manila, however due to multiple military expeditions carried out by the now independent Sulu Sultanate in and around the Visayas, no such tribute would again be given during Buddiman's reign, much less during the reign of his successors.

Very little is known of Tengah's early life in Sulu. What is known, however, is that he was the 2nd of 3 sons and an unknown number of daughters. What happened to these other possible heirs to Sulu is not known. As an official prince of Sulu, he was given the princely title of "Pangiran" which was given to all possible heirs to the Sultanate. He was a direct descendant of the first rulers of Sulu.

Reign

Accession to the throne 
Some Sulu genealogies put the beginning of his reign at 1585, others state the beginning of his reign as 1596. Whichever date is true, what is known as fact is that he was crowned and proclaimed Sultan almost immediately after his father's death. His coronation was recognised by the different Chiefs or Datus of Sulu, who were now his subjects.

Administration 
His reign saw little reform in the Sulu ruling and kinship system which was established nearly a century ago by his ancestors. However, the independence of the Sultanate saw immense economic growth and stronger presence in the region. Sultan Tengah used this economic rise to his advantage, winning over numerous chiefs and subordinate rulers to his side. He no longer had to be dependent of Brunei's economy or military and much less pay Brunei any tribute. This made his lands extremely wealthy. He was known for being incredibly wise and intelligent in ruling the Sultanate. He was also  considered a "tidy" ruler, who kept himself clean and presentable to any chief, this reflected the situation of the young state, who had to prove to its benefactor Brunei, that it was capable of self-governance, and to show a cultured face to the intruding Spaniards, who have opted to make war with the Sulus.

Sharia Law 
He also acted as a judge for his people and he was known for his knowledge of the Sharia code of laws which he used to govern his people. His reign can be considered an Islamic oriented one due to the widespread use of the Sharia law throughout his domains.

Relations with Brunei 
Just a few decades earlier, due to a Spanish attempt to bring Sulu out of Brunei's influence, Sulu gained de facto independence from Brunei. This, however did not mean an end to their friendship as states.
Sultan Tengah arranged for the marriage of his sister to the Sultan Hassan of Brunei. He also took the title Batara, a Bruneian title for Sulu royalty. The marrying off of a female member of the family to another was a known gesture, indicating the superiority of the receiving party in those days.

Islam was also a connecting factor for the 2 Sultanates. Islamic preachers or Panditas regularly travelled from Brunei to Sulu to evangelise the people there.
Militarily, the marriage of Sultan Hassan of Brunei with a Sulu princess begot a son, Muwallil Wasit or Rajah Bongsu who would later become the Sulu sultan himself after his uncle, Sultan Tengah's death.

Relations with Spain 
Sultan Tengah not only inherited an independent and economically stable state from his father when he became Sultan. He also inherited his father's main enemy, the Spaniards. Ever since the Spanish intrusion and colonisation of the Philippines the Muslim states of the Southern Philippines have been threatened by the new Spanish enemy. Though he was not one for military conflict, he was constantly under attack by the Spaniards.

The last major Spanish expedition to Sulu was in 1579, under the command of Captain Juan Acre de Sadornil, the Spaniards led an expedition to Sulu and Mindanao. The expedition was decisively beaten by Sulu. However, in 1593, the Spaniards did succeed in establishing their first ever Catholic mission established by the Jesuits in Samboangan (Sama word for Sabuan, A docking point) at Caldera bay (present-day Recodo). This settlement was short-lived, due to fierce Muslim resistance that threatened to destroy the settlement.

When Sultan Tengah ascended to the throne around 1596, the Spaniards sent an expedition once again to make war with Sulu. They attacked the capital of Sulu, Bauang (known to the Spaniards and later renamed as Jolo). However, this expedition was beaten decisively by the Sulus, under the command of Sultan Tengah's nephew, Rajah Bongsu, or Muwallil Wasit who was sent from Brunei to aid the Sulus militarily. For this act of bravery, Muwallil Wasit was named Adapati or protector of Sulu, while Sultan Tengah continued to rule as Sultan.

In November 1596, the Manila Spanish government sent Juan Ronquillo to build a fortified military garrison in Tampakan to thwart Moro slave raids that began to escalate in number and severity, as Sulu's maritime power increased. But abandoned it the following year to re-position itself to Caldera bay in the Zamboanga Peninsula.

Another expedition was sent by the Spaniards in 1598, however, the Manila Spaniards experienced severe drawbacks and returned to Manila, with no confrontation taking place. This was the last major expedition sent by the Spaniards during Sultan Tengah's reign, marking the end of the first phase of the Spanish-Moro wars. Slave raiding continued as an uninterrupted activity, sanctioned by Sultan Tengah himself to enjoy its economic benefits to the Sultanate.

Dynastic Disputes 
Early on during his reign, it is believed that a cousin of his, known only by the name Adasaolan, attempted to usurp the throne from him. Due to dynastic troubles such as this, Sultan Tengah was dependent of his nephew, Rajah Bongsu, or Muwallil Wasit to protect Sulu, particularly when Sultan Tengah, just newly crowned as ruler had to face the Spaniards in 1596. He was not known as a military-oriented leader and often solved disputes within his domains peacefully and diplomatically. After the Spaniards' last ill-fated expedition, Muwallil Wasit was called back to Brunei where his family was and Sultan Tengah continued to protect his throne from his cousin and usurper. Adasaolan even married a Maguindanao princess to further contest his cousin's right to rule. However, Sultan Tengah, more beloved by his people and favoured by Brunei, maintained the throne and continued to rule Sulu prosperously.

Issue and Death 
Sultan Batara Shah Tengah begot no known children, and therefore had no heir. Sulu was relatively stable and the economy continued to rise during the latter part of his reign. His usurper was dealt with, but the major candidates for the throne were unclear. Upon his death in 1608, Brunei, fearing another dynastic conflict, this time, a much worse one, due to the lack of a ruler for Sulu dispatched Pangiran Muwallil Wasit to Sulu to assert his rights as Sultan. He was a great military leader after all, and had inherited a growing and powerful state on the rise.

References 

Sultans of Sulu
Filipino datus, rajas and sultans
15th-century monarchs in Asia
People from Sulu
Filipino Muslims